Vladimir Janković may refer to:

 Vladimir Velmar-Janković (1895–1976), Serbian writer
 Vlado Janković, Serbian-born Greek professional basketball player, known in Greece as Vladimiros "Vlanto" Giankovits
 Vladimir Janković (football), Serbian football (soccer) manager and former player